Fernando Cyril "Dingdong" Veloso Avanzado (born July 7, 1968) is a Filipino singer, actor, politician and TV host. He is often dubbed as the "Philippines' original prince of pop."

Early life
Avanzado was born on July 7, 1968 in Quezon City.

He was born to the political Veloso Family of Samar, to Fernando Avanzado Sr., a former politician and to lawyer Carina Flores, the current mayor of Oton, Iloilo.

He was part of Kundirana, an all male group formed in De La Salle University where Gary Valenciano and Ogie Alcasid has been part of.

Music career
His performance on some movie theme songs prompted Dyna Records to sign him to a record deal. His single, "Ikaw Lamang", earned him his first Gold certification. His first major concert, called Shine On, was held in Rizal Theatre (now occupied by Makati Shangri-La, Manila).

In 1988, he released the album Tatlong Beinte Singko under Dyna Records. The album contained eight tracks, including hit singles: "Ikaw Lamang", "Maghihintay Sa'yo", and "Tatlong Beinte Singko" (composed by Rannie Raymundo). In the same year, he staged his second major concert at the Folk Arts Theater.

From 1988 to 1990, he performed two major concerts at the University of Life Theater and Recreational Arena (ULTRA). He also starred in several youth-oriented films such as Pik Pak Boom, I Love You 3x a Day, Estudyante Blues, and Love at First Sight.

From 1991 to 1994, Avanzado returned to performing and touring in different regions of the country. His nationwide tour gave him a larger audience and further increased his popularity. His fame grew when his compositions "Paalam Na" (co-written with his then-girlfriend, Rachel Alejandro) and "I Will Be There for You" gained recognition. In 1994, he co-starred in the film Paniwalaan Mo, an OctoArts Films movie taken from one of his songs as Dawn Zulueta’s brother, opposite Aga Muhlach, Jamie Rivera and Tonton Gutierrez. In 1997, he recorded his seventh album, Decade After, which was released by GMA Records (formerly Infinity Music) in celebration of ten years in the music business. The album contained hits like "Wish I Could" and "To Love Again" by Sharon Cuneta. The album went platinum.

It was also during this time that he met singer-actress Jessa Zaragoza in 1998 and married her in 2001. Several foreign concerts followed, where they performed in Australia, Hong Kong, Japan, Canada, and the United States.

In 2000, Avanzado released the album, Here To Stay, under Star Records. It contained the hit song, "Walang Kapalit", by Rey Valera. As well as singing, Avanzado started directing concerts for other artists.

He released a duet album, Laging Ikaw, on Universal Records, in 2005. In 2012, Avanzado released Download, which was produced by Viva Records. All tracks on the album were original songs written by Avanzado.

Political career

In 1998, he embarked on a new career as he ran for public office and was seated in the city council of the 3rd District of Quezon City. In a span of three years, he was able to establish Quezon City as the "City of Stars", highlighting the major film networks of the film and music industry to boost tourism.

In 2007, Avanzado migrated to the United States, settling in Vallejo, California, with his wife.

In 2012, he also announced his intention to run for Vice Governor of Siquijor under the Liberal Party. In the 2013 elections, Avanzado received 25,159 votes compared to 20,472 from his opponent, Art Pacatang, from Lakas–CMD.

Discography

Studio albums
Dingdong Avanzado (1988; Dyna Music)
Just Can't Stop (1989; Dyna Music)
Reachin' High (1991; OctoArts International)
Coming of Age (1993; OctoArts International)
Brand New Love (1994; OctoArts International)
Decade After (1997; Infiniti Music)
Recall (1999; Infiniti Music - distribution under BMG Records Pilipinas)
Here to Stay (2003; Star Music)
Laging Ikaw (with Jessa Zarragoza) (2005; Universal Records)
Download (2012; Viva Records)

Extended play albums
Dingdong Avanzado Extended Play (1987; Dyna Music)

Compilation albums
The Best of Dingdong Avanzado (1992; Dyna Music)
OPM Timeless Hits: Dingdong Avanzado (1997; PolyEast Records)
The Story of Dingdong Avanzado (2002; PolyEast Records)

Singles
"Ikaw Lamang" (1987)
"Just Can't Stop" (1989)
"Break Kung Break" (1989)
"Please, Baby, Please" (1989)
"Basta't Kasama Kita" (1989)
"Naghihintay Sa'yo" (1989)
"Download" (2012)
"Pangarap" (2012)

Music videos
"Wish I Could" (1996)
"Download" (2012)
"Pangarap" (2012)

Covers by other artists
Basta't Kasama Kita (1989) (Covered By: Josh Santana & Daryl Ong, and also covered by pinoy punk rock band The Ultimate Heroes,  also covered by his wife Jessa Zaragoza-Avanzado & himself the original singer; also used in the following teleseryes: Basta't Kasama Kita & FPJs Ang Probinsyano)

Awards
Song of the Year – "Paalam Na", Awit Awards 1995
Best Ballad Recording – "Paalam Na", Awit Awards 1995
Best Dance Recording – "I Will Be There For You", Awit Awards 1996
Best Concert Director (nomination) – Aliw Awards 2005
Celebrity Inductee Winner – Eastwood City Walk of Fame Philippines 2009

Filmography

Television
I Love You Three Times a Day (1982)
That's Entertainment (1986–1991) (GMA Network)
Estudyante Blues (1989–1990) (PTV 4)
Paniwalaan Mo (1993)
ASAP (1995) (ABS-CBN)
9 Mornings – performer (2002)
Shall We Dance: The Celebrity Dance Challenge (2005) (TV5)
Magpakailanman (2005) (GMA Network)
Jologs Guide (2005) (GMA Network)
Balikbayan (2005) (QTV)
Noel (2005) (QTV)
Search for the Star in a Million (2005–2006) (ABS-CBN)
O-Ha! (2006) (TV5)
Pinoy Dream Academy: Little Dreamers (2008) (ABS-CBN)
Talentadong Pinoy (2009) (TV5)
Sarap at Home (2010) (QTV)
Showtime (2010) (ABS-CBN)
Bagets: Just Got Lucky (2011) (TV5)
Walang Tulugan with the Master Showman (2014) (GMA Network)
Trenderas (2014) (TV5) 
Sabado Badoo (2015) (GMA Network)
Sunday PinaSaya (2015) (GMA Network)
Full House Tonight (2017) (GMA Network)
Celebrity Bluff Season 3 (2017) (GMA Network)
Your Face Sounds Familiar (2018) (ABS-CBN)
Wowowin (2020) (GMA Network)
Happy Time (2021) (NET 25)
Sing Galing: Sing-lebrity Edition (2021) (TV5)

Film
I Love You 3x a Day (1988)
Pik Pak Boom (1988) - Sonny
Estudyante Blues (1989)

References

External links

1968 births
Living people
20th-century Filipino male singers
Liberal Party (Philippines) politicians
People from Quezon City
People from Siquijor
That's Entertainment (Philippine TV series)
That's Entertainment Tuesday Group Members
GMA Network personalities
GMA Music artists
ABS-CBN personalities
Star Music artists
Viva Artists Agency
Viva Records (Philippines) artists
Filipino actor-politicians